This article shows the roster of all participating teams at the 2022 FIVB Volleyball Women's Nations League.

The following is Belgium's roster in the 2022 Women's Nations League.

Head Coach:  Gert Vande Broek 

2 Elise Van Sas 
3 Britt Herbots 
4 Nathalie Lemmens 
5 Jodie Guilliams 
6 Helena Gilson 
7 Celine Van Gestel 
8 Grobelna Kaja 
9 Nel Demeyer 
10 Pauline Martin 
11 Stien Goris 
12 Charlotte Krenicky 
13 Marlies Janssens 
14 Laura Meynckens 
15 Jutta Van de Vyver 
16 Laure Flament 
18 Britt Rampelberg 
19 Silke Van Avermaet 
20 Marie Lambrix 
21 Manon Stragier 
22 Anna Koulberg 
24 Sara De Donder 
27 Yana Wouters 
28 Lara Nagels 
29 Lena Versteynen 
30 Britt Ruysschaert

The following is Brazil's roster in the 2022 Women's Nations League.

Head Coach:  Zé Roberto 

1 Milka Silva 
2 Diana Duarte 
3 Júlia Kudiess 
4 Ana Carolina da Silva 
5 Priscila Daroit 
6 Nyeme Costa 
7 Rosamaria Montibeller 
8 Macris Carneiro 
9 Roberta Ratzke 
10 Gabriela Guimarães 
11 Karina Barbosa 
12 Ana Cristina de Souza 
13 Kasiely Clemente 
14 Natália Araujo 
15 Lorena Viezel 
16 Kisy Nascimento 
17 Júlia Bergmann 
18 Mayany de Souza 
19 Tainara Santos 
20 Lorrayna da Silva 
21 Kenya Malachias 
22 Claúdia Bueno 
23 Bruna Honório 
24 Lorenne Teixeira 
25 Laís Vasques

The following is Bulgaria's roster in the 2022 Women's Nations League.

Head Coach:  Lorenzo Micelli 

1 Gergana Dimitrova 
2 Nasya Dimitrova 
3 Polina Neykova 
4 Eva Yaneva 
5 Maria Yordanova 
6 Miroslava Paskova 
7 Lora Kitipova 
8 Petya Barakova 
9 Borislava Saykova 
10 Mira Todorovas 
11 Hristina Vuchkova 
12 Dima Usheva 
13 Galina Karabasheva 
15 Zhana Todorova 
16 Elitsa Vasileva 
17 Radostina Marinova 
18 Silvana Chausheva 
19 Aleksandra Milanova 
20 Vangeliya Rachkovska 
21 Monika Krasteva 
24 Lora Slavcheva 
26 Mirela Shahpazova 
27 Iva Dudova 
28 Mariya Krivoshiyska 
29 Ralitsa Vasileva

The following is the Canada's roster in the 2022 Women's Nations League.

Head coach:  Shannon Winzer

1 Allyssah Fitterer 
2 Melissa Langegger 
3 Kiera Van Ryk 
4 Vicky Savard 
5 Julia Murmann 
6 Jazmine White 
7 Claire Cossarini 
8 Alicia Ogoms 
9 Alexa Gray 
10 Courtney Baker 
11 Andrea Mitrovic 
12 Jennifer Cross 
13 Brie King 
14 Hilary Howe 
15 Shainah Joseph 
16 Caroline Livingston 
17 Katerina Georgiadis 
18 Kim Robitaille 
19 Emily Maglio 
20 Arielle Palermo 
21 Avery Heppell 
22 Kennedy Snape 
23 Laura Madill 
24 Natasha Calkins 
25 Sydney Grills

The following is the China's roster in the 2022 Women's Nations League.

Head Coach:  Cai Bin 

1 Yuan Xinyue 
3 Diao Linyu 
4 Yang Hanyu 
5 Gao Yi 
6 Gong Xiangyu 
7 Wang Yuanyuan 
8 Jin Ye 
10 Wang Yunlu 
11 Wang Yizhu 
12 Li Yingying 
13 Cai Yaqian 
14 Zheng Yixin 
15 Wang Weiyi 
16 Ding Xia 
17 Ni Feifan 
18 Miao Yiwen 
19 Chen Peiyan 
20 Wu Mengjie 
21 Wang Yifan 
22 Xu Jianan 
23 Wang Mengjie 
24 Zhong Hu 
25 Du Qingqing 
26 Wang Wenhan

The following is the Dominican Republic's roster in the 2022 Women's Nations League.

Head coach:  Marcos Kwiek

2 Yaneirys Rodriguez 
3 Esthefany Rabit 
4 Vielka Peralta 
5 Brenda Castillo 
6 Camil Domínguez 
7 Niverka Marte 
9 Angélica Hinojosa 
12 Yokaty Pérez 
13 Massiel Matos 
15 Madeline Paredes 
16 Yonkaira Peña 
17 Gina Mambrú 
18 Bethania de la Cruz 
19 Cándida Arias 
20 Brayelin Martínez 
21 Jineiry Martínez 
22 Samaret Caraballo 
23 Gaila González 
24 Geraldine González 
25 Larysmer Martínez

The following is the Germany's roster in the 2022 Women's Nations League.

Head coach:  Vital Heynen

1 Linda Bock 
2 Pia Kästner 
4 Pogany Anna 
5 Corina Glaab 
6 Jennifer Janiska 
7 Ivana Vanjak 
9 Lina Alsmeier 
10 Lena Stigrot 
12 Hanna Orthmann 
13 Saskia Hippe 
14 Marie Schölzel 
15 Elisa Lohmann 
16 Lea Ambrosius 
19 Sophie Dreblow 
21 Camilla Weitzel 
22 Monique Strubbe 
23 Sarah Straube 
24 Anastasia Cekulaev 
25 Vanessa Agbortabi 
28 Annie Cesar 
29 Pia Leweling 
30 Pia Fernau 
35 Luisa Van Clewe 
38 Meghan Barthel 
44 Laura Emonts

The following is Italy's roster in the 2022 Women's Nations League.

Head Coach:  Davide Mazzanti 

1 Marina Lubian 
2 Francesca Bosio 
3 Alessia Gennari 
4 Sara Bonifacio 
5 Ofelia Malinov 
6 Monica De Gennaro 
7 Eleonora Fersino 
8 Alessia Orro 
9 Caterina Bosetti 
10 Cristina Chirichella 
11 Anna Danesi 
12 Anastasia Guerra 
13 Ilaria Battistoni 
14 Elena Pietrini 
15 Sylvia Nwakalor 
16 Sofia D'Odorico 
17 Miriam Sylla 
18 Paola Ogechi Egonu 
19 Federica Squarcini 
20 Sara Panetoni 
21 Alice Degradi 
22 Ruth Enweonwu 
23 Elena Perinelli 
24 Alessia Mazzaro 
25 Loveth Omoruyi

The following is the Japan's roster in the 2022 Women's Nations League.

Head Coach:  Masayoshi Manabe 

1 Akane Yamagishi 
2 Mami Uchiseto 
3 Sarina Koga 
4 Mayu Ishikawa 
5 Haruyo Shimamura 
7 Mika Shibata 
8 Haruka Miyashita 
9 Manami Kojima 
10 Arisa Inoue 
13 Shuka Kaneda 
14 Fuyumi Hawi Okumu Oba 
15 Kotona Hayashi 
19 Nichika Yamada 
22 Satomi Fukudome 
23 Mami Yokota 
24 Tamaki Matsui 
25 Erina Ogawa 
26 Airi Miyabe 
28 Asuka Hamamatsu 
30 Nanami Seki 
32 Miyu Nakagawa 
35 Shion Hirayama 
37 Ameze Miyabe 
38 Yoshino Sato 
39 Nanami Asano

The following is Netherlands' roster in the 2022 Women's Nations League.

Head Coach:  Avital Selinger 

1 Kirsten Knip 
2 Fleur Savelkoel 
3 Marieke van der Mark 
4 Celeste Plak 
5 Jolien Knollema 
7 Juliët Lohuis 
8 Demi Korevaar 
9 Myrthe Schoot 
10 Sarah Van Aalen 
11 Anne Buijs 
12 Bongaerts Britt 
13 Jolijn de Haan 
14 Laura Dijkema 
16 Indy Baijens 
17 Iris Vos 
18 Jasper Marrit 
19 Nika Daalderop 
20 Tessa Polder 
21 Britte Stuut 
23 Eline Timmerman 
24 Laura de Zwart 
25 Florien Reesink 
26 Elles Dambrink 
27 Iris Scholten 
29 Famke Boonstra

The following is the Poland's roster in the 2022 Women's Nations League.

Head coach:  Stefano Lavarini

1 Maria Stenzel 
2 Anna Stencel 
3 Klaudia Alagierska 
5 Agnieszka Kąkolewska 
6 Kamila Witkowska 
7 Martyna Łazowska 
8 Zuzanna Górecka 
9 Magdalena Stysiak 
10 Monika Fedusio 
11 Martyna Łukasik 
12 Aleksandra Szczygłowska 
14 Joanna Wołosz 
15 Martyna Czyrniańska 
16 Justyna Łysiak 
17 Julita Piasecka 
18 Aleksandra Gryka 
19 Iga Wasilewska 
21 Alicja Grabka 
22 Weronika Szlagowska 
23 Karolina Drużkowska 
24 Paulina Damaske 
25 Weronika Sobiczewska 
26 Katarzyna Wenerska 
30 Olivia Różański 
96 Magdalena Jurczyk

The following is Serbia's roster in the 2022 Women's Nations League.

Head coach:  Daniele Santarelli

1 Bianka Buša 
2 Katarina Lazović 
3 Sara Carić 
4 Bojana Živković 
5 Mina Popović 
7 Ana Jakšić 
8 Slađana Mirković 
9 Brankica Mihajlović 
12 Teodora Pušić 
13 Ana Bjelica 
14 Maja Aleksić 
15 Jovana Stevanović 
17 Tijana Milojević 
19 Bojana Milenković 
20 Jovana Zelenović 
21 Jovana Kocić 
22 Sara Lozo 
23 Mila Đorđević 
25 Božica Marković 
26 Vanja Savić 
28 Jelena Delić 
31 Sanja Djurdjević 
33 Jovana Cvetković 
34 Jovana Mirosavljević 
35 Mina Mijatović

The following is the South Korea's roster in the 2022 Women's Nations League.

Head Coach:  Cesar Hernández González 

1 Yoo Seo-yeun 
2 Kim Ha-kyung 
3 Yeum Hye-seon 
4 Han Da-hye 
5 Noh Ran 
6 Lee Seon-woo 
7 Kang So-hwi 
8 Jung Ho-young 
9 Lee Ju-ah 
10 Go Ye-rim 
11 Park Hye-min 
12 Lee Da-hyeon 
13 Park Jeong-ah 
14 Jeong Ji-yun 
15 Hwang Min-kyung 
16 Lee Han-bi 
17 Park Hae-jin 
18 Choi Jeong-min 
19 Kim Hee-jin 
20 Han Su-jin 
21 Kim Chae-yeon 
22 An Hye-jin 
23 Park Eun-jin 
24 Na Hyun-soo 
25 Moon Myoung-hwa

The following is Thailand's roster in the 2022 Women's Nations League.

Head coach:  Danai Sriwatcharamethakul

1 Wipawee Srithong 
2 Piyanut Pannoy 
3 Pornpun Guedpard 
4 Thatdao Nuekjang 
6 Kannika Thipachot 
7 Hathairat Jarat 
8 Watchareeya Nuanjam 
9 Jarasporn Bundasak 
10 Pattiya Juangjan 
11 Khatthalee Pinsuwan 
12 Hattaya Bamrungsuk 
13 Natthanicha Jaisaen 
14 Sutadta Chuewulim 
15 Kaewkalaya Kamulthala 
16 Pimpichaya Kokram 
17 Tichaya Boonlert 
18 Ajcharaporn Kongyot 
19 Chatchu-on Moksri 
20 Supattra Pairoj 
21 Thanacha Sooksod 
22 Nuttaporn Sanitklang 
23 Sirima Manakij 
24 Tichakorn Boonlert 
25 Sasipapron Janthawisut 
36 Donphon Sinpho

The following is the Türkiye's roster in the 2022 Women's Nations League.

Head coach:  Giovanni Guidetti

1 Beyza Arıcı 
2 Simge Şebnem Aköz 
3 Cansu Özbay 
4 Tuğba Şenoğlu 
5 Bahar Akbay 
6 Saliha Şahin 
7 Hande Baladın 
8 Buse Ünal 
9 Meliha İsmailoğlu 
10 Ayça Aykaç 
11 Derya Cebecioğlu 
12 Elif Şahin 
13 Meryem Boz 
14 Eda Erdem Dündar 
17 Sıla Çalışkan 
18 Zehra Güneş 
19 Ceren Kapucu 
20 Aylin Acar 
21 Buse Kayacan 
22 İlkin Aydın 
23 Yaprak Erkek 
28 Yasemin Yıldırım 
44 Ayçin Akyol 
77 Tutku Burcu Yüzgenç 
99 Ebrar Karakurt

The following is USA's roster in the 2022 Women's Nations League.

Head coach:  Karch Kiraly

1 Micha Hancock 
2 Jordyn Poulter 
3 Kathryn Plummer 
4 Justine Wong-Orantes 
5 Morgan Hentz 
6 Tori Dixon 
7 Lauren Carlini 
8 Hannah Tapp 
9 Madison Kingdon 
10 Brionne Butler 
11 Andrea Drews 
12 Jordan Thompson 
13 Sarah Wilhite Parsons 
15 Haleigh Washington 
16 Dana Rettke 
17 Dani Drews 
18 Kara Bajema 
19 Jenna Gray 
20 Danielle Cuttino 
22 Kendall White 
23 Kelsey Robinson 
24 Chiaka Ogbogu 
30 Ali Frantti 
31 Anna Stevenson 
33 Nia Reed

References

External links
Fédération Internationale de Volleyball – official website
Official website

2022 squads
FIVB Volleyball Women's Nations League squads